Mullur is a village near Sarjapur road in Karnataka, India. It is in Bengaluru East Taluk, Bengaluru District in Karnataka. An adjacent village is Gunjur via Kachamaranahalli. The distance from Vidhana Soudha is 22 km.out of the village there is one school called  Sri Sri Ravishankar vidhya mandir and there is a railway station 3.5 km from the village.

Demographics
As of the 2001 India census, Mullur had a population of around 2000.

Temples
There are three temples in the village: one being to Goddess Maheshwari, the most powerful one; another old temple, Gopalaswamy temple; and the latest one is the Sri Rama Temple.

See also
 Bengaluru
 Districts of Karnataka

References

Villages in Kolar district